Walter Good (January 27, 1908 – July 8, 2001) was an American weightlifter. He competed in the men's middleweight event at the 1936 Summer Olympics.

His brother Bill Good was also an Olympic weightlifter.

References

External links
 

1908 births
2001 deaths
American male weightlifters
Olympic weightlifters of the United States
People associated with physical culture
People from Lancaster County, Pennsylvania
Weightlifters at the 1936 Summer Olympics
20th-century American people